Caledon State Park is a  state park located in King George, Virginia. As of 2010, the yearly visitation was 49,328.  The property was initially owned by the Alexander brothers, founders of the city of Alexandria, and was established in 1659 as Caledon Plantation. Ownership passed, in 1974, to the Commonwealth of Virginia.

A  portion of the park known as the Caledon Natural Area was designated a National Natural Landmark in 1974 for its old-growth oak-tulip poplar forest. The park also provides a habitat for bald eagles along the Potomac River. Adjacent to the park is the Chotank Creek Natural Area Preserve, a state-designated private conservation area that further protects bald eagle habitat, in addition to wetlands and other significant communities.

See also
List of Virginia state parks
List of National Natural Landmarks in Virginia

References

External links
Virginia Department of Conservation and Recreation: Caledon State Park

Parks in King George County, Virginia
National Natural Landmarks in Virginia
State parks of Virginia
Protected areas established in 1974
1974 establishments in Virginia